Altdorf (sometimes written as Altdorf UR in order to distinguish it from the other "Altdorfs"; German for "old village") is a historic town and municipality in Switzerland. It is the capital of the Swiss canton of Uri.

It is also the junction towards to the two passes Saint Gotthard to the south, a major north–south axis through the Alps, and the Klausen Pass to the east. Altdorf sits on the Gotthard line and is the last railway station before the entrance into the new Gotthard Base Tunnel, the world's longest railway tunnel.

The official language of Altdorf is (the Swiss variety of Standard) German, but the main spoken language is the local variant of the Alemannic Swiss German dialect.

Geography

Altdorf consists of the town proper on the flat alluvial plain by the Reuss, between the right bank of the Reuss and the steep hillside of the Rossstock to the east. Halfway up (about ) the scattered hamlets of Eggberge on a high terrace above the town also belongs to the municipality. Altdorf adjoins the municipalities of Attinghausen and Seedorf across the Reuss to the west, Flüelen, the port village at the Urnersee to the north, Bürglen in the Schächental to the east and south, and Schattdorf to the south.

Of this area, 35.9% is used for agricultural purposes, while 39.3% is forested. Of the rest of the land, 23% is settled (buildings or roads) and the remainder (1.9%) is non-productive (rivers, glaciers or mountains). , 37.2% of the total land area was forested. Of the agricultural land, 0.7% is used for farming or pastures, while 35.2% is used for orchards or vine crops. Of the settled areas, 11.3% is covered with buildings, 2.6% is industrial, 0.8% is classed as special developments, 1.5% is listed as parks and greenbelts and 6.7% is transportation infrastructure. Of the unproductive areas, 1.1% is unproductive flowing water (rivers), there is 0.6% that is too rocky for vegetation, and 0.2% is other unproductive land.

History

The earliest evidence of a settlement in Altdorf are several La Tène era bronze ax-heads and iron tools from the 3rd century BC. The people that settled in this region initially settled in the forest, and expanded toward the banks of the Reuss. When the Reuss periodically flooded, the low lying settlements were destroyed and the inhabitants were driven back to the "old town", a possible source of the name Altdorf.

Following the collapse of the Roman Empire the local Gallo-Roman population of Altdorf began to mix with the Germanic Alamanni during the 7th century. The earliest evidence of this is the grave (dated to 670–680) of an armed horseman located in the local St Martin's Church.

The current town was first mentioned in 1223 as Alttorf, whereas some sources from the 16 to 19th centuries occasionally refer to it as Uri.

Demographics

As of 2017, 1,347 people or 14.8% of the population was made up of foreign nationals. From 2008 through 2017 the population has increased at an annual rate of 0.8%. Most of the population speaks German (88.3%), with Serbo-Croatian being second most common (4.2%) and Italian being third ( 2.5%).   the gender distribution of the population was 48.4% male and 51.6% female.

In Altdorf about 65.2% of the population (between age 25–64) have completed either non-mandatory upper secondary education or additional higher education (either university or a Fachhochschule).

Altdorf has an unemployment rate of 1.45%. , there were 137 people employed in the primary economic sector and about 49 businesses involved in this sector. 1,748 people are employed in the secondary sector and there are 77 businesses in this sector. 3,585 people are employed in the tertiary sector, with 403 businesses in this sector.

Historical population
 source:

Sights 
Tell Monument

Altdorf is best known as the place where, according to the legend, William Tell shot the apple from his son's head. This act by tradition happened in the market-place, where in 1895, at the foot of an old tower (with rude frescoes commemorating the feat), there was set up a fine bronze statue (by Richard Kissling of Zürich) of Tell and his son. In 1899 a theatre was opened close to the town's center for the purpose of performing Schiller's play of Wilhelm Tell.

Historisches Museum and the Haus für Kunst Uri 
In 1905 a Museum was opened on Gottardstrasse just south of the centre of the town that houses a collection of local antiquities, weapons and regional furniture, as well as a collection of portraits of important Uri citizens, including fine ones by the Andermatt-born Felix Maria Diogg (1762–1834). There are several paintings here by the Swiss-born American artist Adolfo Müller-Ury (1862–1947) whose family came from Hospental, including portraits of Pope Pius X, Pope Pius XI, Cardinal Merry del Val, the artist's father Alois Muller, his uncle Domherr Josef Muller, and a large allegorical work Alpenrose und Edelweiss. The museum was extended in the 1990s.

Recently the town has established the Haus für Kunst Uri at Herrengasse 2 in a partly converted historic house with a large contemporary extension creating an attractive exhibition space. The work of Swiss and international contemporary artists from Uri is exhibited here, and they sometimes have exhibitions of earlier historical art.

Climate
Between 1961 and 1990 Altdorf had an average of 133.7 days of rain per year and on average received  of precipitation. During this month there was precipitation for an average of 13.2 days. The month with the most days of precipitation was June, with an average of 14.4, but with only  of precipitation. According to the Köppen Climate Classification system, Altdorf is classified as Cfb, or Marine West Coast Climate.

International relations

Twin towns – sister cities

Altdorf is twinned with:
 Altdorf bei Nürnberg, Germany (since 1971)

Transport
Altdorf is served by the regional public transport hub of Altdorf railway station, situated within the municipality and on the Gotthard railway. In 1899 a carriage-road was opened from Altdorf through the Schächental and over the Klausen Pass to the village of Linthal and so to Glarus. In 1906, the Altdorf–Flüelen tramway was constructed to connect the centre of Altdorf with Fluelen railway station.  The electric tramway operated until 1951, when it was replaced by a bus service.

Notable people 

 Sebastian Peregrin Zwyer (1597–1661) was a Swiss military commander, mercenary entrepreneur, and one of the foremost politicians of the Old Swiss Confederacy; died in Altdorf
 Henry Haller (born 1923 in Altdorf, Uri) a retired Chef who served as Executive Chef at the White House for 22 years
 Beat Streuli (born 1957 in Altdorf, Uri) a Swiss visual artist who works with photo and video based media
 Luzia Zberg (born 1970 in Altdorf, Uri) a retired racing cyclist
 Beat Zberg (born 1971 in Altdorf, Uri) a Swiss former professional road bicycle racer
 Matthias Simmen (born 1972 in Altdorf, Uri) a retired Swiss biathlete, he competed in the 2002, 2006 and 2010 Winter Olympics
 Markus Zberg (born 1974 in Altdorf, Uri) a retired Swiss professional road bicycle racer

See also
List of municipalities of Switzerland
Municipalities of the canton of Uri

Notes and references

Notes

References

External links
 
 Official website

 
Cantonal capitals of Switzerland
Altdorf (capital)
Municipalities of the canton of Uri
Cities in Switzerland